Sweden competed at the 2022 Winter Olympics in Beijing, China, from 4 to 20 February 2022.

Oliwer Magnusson and Emma Nordin were the country's flagbearers during the opening ceremony. Meanwhile biathlete Elvira Öberg was the flagbearer during the closing ceremony.

With eight gold medals and 18 medals in total, this was Sweden's most successful Winter Olympics of all time in terms of both gold and total number of medals, beating the previous records set in 2018 and 2014, respectively. It marked the first time Sweden won medals in six different sports at the Winter Games, and they managed to win gold medals in these sports. Additionally, the country won its first (and second) gold medal in freestyle skiing, first gold medals in speed skating since 1988, and became the first country to win medals in all three events in curling at the same Winter Olympics.

Medalists

The following Swedish competitors won medals at the games. In the discipline sections below, the medalists' names are bolded.

Competitors
The following is the list of number of competitors participating at the Games per sport/discipline.

Oskar Eriksson was selected in both the men's and mixed team events in curling.

Alpine skiing

SOC selected Hanna Aronsson Elfman, Elsa Fermbäck, Kristoffer Jakobsen, Sara Hector, Hilma Lövblom, Mattias Rönngren, Anna Swenn-Larsson and Charlotta Säfvenberg

Men

Women

Mixed

Biathlon

Sweden qualified five men and six women in biathlon. SOC used all quotas and selected the nine athletes listed below as well as Stina Nilsson and Malte Stefansson who did not start in any events.

Men

Women

Mixed

Cross-country skiing

Sweden qualified 16 athletes (8 men and 8 women) and four teams in cross-country skiing. The following athletes were selected by the SOC:

Distance
Men

Women

Sprint
Men

Women

Johanna Hagström was reserve at home for women's sprint. Linn Svahn was originally selected as well but was deselected due to injury.

Curling

Summary

Men's tournament

Sweden has qualified their men's team (five athletes), by finishing in the top six teams in the 2021 World Men's Curling Championship. On 4 June 2021, the Swedish Olympic Committee announced that Team Niklas Edin would be their men's team representatives.

Round robin
Sweden had a bye in draws 4, 7 and 11.

Draw 1
Wednesday, 9 February, 20:05

Draw 2
Thursday, 10 February, 14:05

Draw 3
Friday, 11 February, 9:05

Draw 5
Saturday, 12 February, 14:05

Draw 6
Sunday, 13 February, 9:05

Draw 8
Monday, 14 February, 14:05

Draw 9
Tuesday, 15 February, 9:05

Draw 10
Tuesday, 15 February, 20:05

Draw 12
Thursday, 17 February, 9:05

Semifinal
Thursday, 17 February, 20:05

Final
Saturday, 19 February, 14:05

Women's tournament

Sweden has qualified their women's team (five athletes), by finishing in the top six teams in the 2021 World Women's Curling Championship. On 4 June 2021, the Swedish Olympic Committee announced that Team Anna Hasselborg would be their women's team representatives.

Round robin
Sweden had a bye in draws 3, 7 and 10.

Draw 1
Thursday, 10 February, 9:05

Draw 2
Thursday, 10 February, 20:05

Draw 4
Saturday, 12 February, 9:05

Draw 5
Saturday, 12 February, 20:05

Draw 6
Sunday, 13 February, 14:05

Draw 8
Monday, 14 February, 20:05

Draw 9
Tuesday, 15 February, 14:05

Draw 11
Wednesday, 16 February, 20:05

Draw 12
Thursday, 17 February, 14:05

Semifinal
Friday, 18 February, 20:05

Bronze medal game
Saturday, 19 February, 20:05

Mixed doubles tournament

Sweden has qualified their mixed doubles team (two athletes), by finishing in the top seven teams in the 2021 World Mixed Doubles Curling Championship. On 4 June 2021, the Swedish Olympic Committee announced that Almida de Val and Oskar Eriksson would be their mixed doubles representatives.

Round robin
Sweden had a bye in draws 3, 9, 10 and 13.

Draw 1
Wednesday, 2 February, 20:05

Draw 2
Thursday, 3 February, 9:05

Draw 4
Thursday, 3 February, 20:05

Draw 5
Friday, 4 February, 8:35

Draw 6
Friday, 4 February, 13:35

Draw 7
Saturday, 5 February, 9:05

Draw 8
Saturday, 5 February, 14:05

Draw 11
Sunday, 6 February, 14:05

Draw 12
Sunday, 6 February, 20:05

Semifinal
Monday, 7 February, 20:05

Bronze medal game
Tuesday, 8 February, 14:05

Figure skating

Sweden qualified one male and one female figure skater, based on its placement at the 2021 World Figure Skating Championships in Stockholm, Sweden. Nikolaj Majorov and Josefin Taljegård were selected in January 2022.

Freestyle skiing

SOC selected fourteen athletes in freestyle.

Freeski

Moguls

Albin Holmgren was originally selected but was deselected due to injury.

Ski cross

Ice hockey 

Summary
Key:
 OT – Overtime
 GWS – Match decided by penalty-shootout

Men's tournament

Sweden men's national ice hockey team qualified a team of 25 players by finishing 4th in the 2019 IIHF World Ranking. SOC selected the team in June 2021.

Team roster

Group play

Quarterfinal

Semifinal

Bronze medal game

Women's tournament

Sweden women's national ice hockey team qualified by winning a final qualification tournament. SOC selected the team for the games shortly thereafter.

Team roster

Group play

Quarterfinal

Luge

Sweden qualified one woman and one man in luge. SOC selected siblings Svante Kohala and Tove Kohala.

Ski jumping

Sweden qualified one athlete in ski jumping. SOC selected Frida Westman. She was Sweden's first woman to compete in the sport. It was also Sweden's first participation in the sport since the 1994 games.

Snowboarding

Sweden qualified two athletes in big air and slopestyle. SOC selected Niklas Mattsson and Sven Thorgren.

Freestyle

Speed skating 

Nils van der Poel has qualified in men's 5 000 and 10 000 metres by finishing top 8 in the qualification points ranking. He was selected by SOC in November 2021.

Key: OR=Olympic record, WR=World record

See also
Sweden at the 2022 Winter Paralympics

References

2022
Nations at the 2022 Winter Olympics
Winter Olympics